Bob & Earl were an American music singing duo in the 1960s, best known for writing and recording the original version of "Harlem Shuffle".

Career
The original duo were Bobby Byrd and Earl Nelson. They had both been members of The Hollywood Flames, a prolific doo-wop group in Los Angeles, California whose major hit was "Buzz-Buzz-Buzz" in 1958, on which Nelson sang lead. By 1957, Byrd had started a parallel solo career, writing and recording for contractual reasons as Bobby Day. He wrote and recorded the original version of "Little Bitty Pretty One", and had a hit of his own with "Rockin' Robin" (1958). In 1957, Day/Byrd and Nelson began recording together as Bob & Earl, on the Class record label. However, these releases had relatively little success, and Day/Byrd restarted his solo career.

In 1962, Nelson recruited a second "Bob", Bobby Relf, who also used the stage names of Bobby Garrett and Bobby Valentino. Relf had already led several Los Angeles based acts in his career, including the Laurels, the Upfronts, and Valentino and the Lovers. The latter two groups also featured the then pianist and bass singer Barry White.

This duo of Relf and Nelson recorded several singles for different labels, before "Harlem Shuffle" in 1963. The song was written by Relf and Nelson, arranged by Gene Page, and produced by Fred Smith. It was based on a number called "Slauson Shuffletime" (named after a boulevard in Los Angeles) by another Los Angeles singer, Round Robin. When released on the Marc label, "Harlem Shuffle" became a modest hit on the US Billboard chart. However, its main success came as late as 1969, when it was re-released in the UK and became a Top Ten hit there. Reportedly, George Harrison called it his favorite record of all time.

In 1964, the duo signed to Loma Records. They recorded for the label but no singles were released. By 1965, Nelson had achieved further success as a solo artist under the alias of Jackie Lee with "The Duck", a hit dance record which reached No. 14 in the U.S. When "Harlem Shuffle" became successful on reissue, Nelson and Relf reunited as Bob & Earl to tour. The duo split up for the last time in the early 1970s. Relf composed the song "Bring Back My Yesterday", recorded by Barry White on his first 20th Century Records album, 1973's I've Got So Much to Give.

Discography

Studio albums
 Harlem Shuffle (1964)
 Bob & Earl (1969)

Singles

References

External links
 
  Obituary of Earl Nelson in The Independent, 30 July 2008

Bob and Earl
Bob and Earl
Class Records artists
Sue Records artists
Bob and Earl
Loma Records artists
Uni Records artists
Jay Boy artists
Musical groups established in 1957
Rhythm and blues duos
Musical groups from Los Angeles
American rhythm and blues musical groups
American soul musical groups
1957 establishments in California